Let It Bleed is an album by the Rolling Stones.

Let It Bleed may also refer to:
"Let It Bleed" (song), a song by the Rolling Stones
Let It Bleed, a song by King Gizzard & the Lizard Wizard, see Willoughby's Beach
Let It Bleed (novel), by Ian Rankin
"Let It Bleed" (Heroes), an episode of the American science fiction drama series Heroes
"Let It Bleed" (CSI), an episode of the American crime drama CSI: Crime Scene Investigation
"Let It Bleed" (Rebus), an episode of the British detective drama Rebus
"Let It Bleed", an episode of the American TV series Supernatural